The Raja Soliman Science and Technology High School (Filipino: Mataas na Paaralang Pang-Agham at Pangteknolohiya ng Raja Soliman) is a public science and technology high school located at Urbiztondo Street in Binondo, Manila, Philippines, although it is geographically within the jurisdiction of the district of San Nicolas. It is a DepEd-recognized science high school and is one of two public science high schools in the City of Manila: the other being the Manila Science High School. It was recognized as a national science and technology high school under Republic Act No. 8843.

References

Science high schools in Manila
Education in Binondo
Educational institutions established in 1964
1964 establishments in the Philippines